This article lists census-designated places (CDPs) in the U.S. state of New Hampshire. As of 2018, there were a total of 83 census-designated places in New Hampshire.

Census-designated places

References

See also
List of cities and towns in New Hampshire
List of counties in New Hampshire

 
Census-designated places
New Hampshire